Fontrieu is a commune in the Tarn department and Occitanie region of southern France. The municipality was established on 1 January 2016 by merger of the former communes of Castelnau-de-Brassac, Ferrières and Le Margnès.

See also 
Communes of the Tarn department

References 

Communes of Tarn (department)
Populated places established in 2016
2016 establishments in France